Chrysaeglia perpendicularis is a moth of the subfamily Arctiinae. It was described by Karel Černý in 1995. It is found in the Philippines and on Sulawesi.

References

Lithosiini
Moths described in 1995